Blackhole, stylized as BLACKHOLE, is a puzzle-platform game developed and published by independent Czech company FiolaSoft Studio. The developers worked with Let's Players and YouTubers on the script for the story and for building the characters. It was first released on February 27, 2015 for Microsoft Windows, followed by Linux and OS X on May 11, 2015.

The game was re-released as Blackhole: Complete Edition on June 15, 2016. This version includes the fully updated base game, 3 DLCs (Testing Lab, Secret of the Entity and Challenge Vault), digital artbook and soundtrack, developer diaries, first prototype of the game, printable high resolution artwork, wallpapers, and collector cards. The same version was ported to the PlayStation 4 and Xbox One consoles on August 8, 2017. And is also compatible with PlayStation 5 and Xbox Series X and Series S.

Gameplay 
Blackhole is a 2D side-scrolling puzzle-platformer. The player's task is to collect "selfburns." At least one must be collected in each level to move on. If all selfburns are collected in the level, the time is saved. The player can also try to get a better time once he collects all of them. To finish the game, the player needs to collect a certain number of selfburns.

The game contains six acts, including Cave, Jungle, and Desert. Every act is set in a different environment and includes different puzzles or objects. For example, the jungle includes trampolines and the desert includes pushable crates. Each act includes a special platform that changes gravity.

Plot 
The game is set in 2121. Earth is threatened by black holes. A group of astronauts are sent on a mission to neutralize them. Their effort is successful until their spaceship called Endera is sucked into one of the massive black holes and crashes on Entity; a mysterious object resembling a planet. The first person to wake up, and who the player takes control of, is the crew's coffee-maker assistant, a.k.a. Coffee Guy; accompanied by the ship's artificial intelligence Auriel loaded into his PDA. The Coffee Guy must collect nanobots called "selfburns" to repair the ship and find the rest of the crew.

Development 
The developers originally intended to remake PacIn: Revenge of Nermessis, FiolaSoft Studio's previous title. Unlike the original game, the remake was intended to be released on Steam and in English. Due to technical problems, the game was cancelled and FiolaSoft started to work on a new project. Vojta Stránský, a member of the FiolaSoft team, began production of a prototype. The prototype interested other members of FiolaSoft and they began to work on it, naming it Blackhole. Blackhole was announced in March 2014 at Game Expo 2014 in Bratislava. Developers also started a Steam Greenlight campaign, and in May 2014 the game was greenlit.

The game was originally scheduled to be released in September 2014, but was delayed several times before being finally released on February 27, 2015.

Developers started to work on a DLC after the release of the original game. The first DLC, titled Testing Laboratory, was released on May 19, 2015. It serves as a prequel to the original game and tells the story about how the Coffee Guy gained his position in the Endera mission. Developers released a free expansion, The Secret of the Entity, on July 13, 2015. The expansion adds 12 new hardcore levels set right after the end of the original game when the Captain finds out that Endera is low on fuel. Both add-ons are included as part of Complete Edition.

Reception
The game has received generally positive reviews from critics. It currently has a rating of 82% at Metacritic. Destructoid gave the game 9/10, praising the gameplay for requiring thinking as well as platform skills. The review also praised the writing, even though "it could be delivered in a more convenient fashion."

References

External links
 
 

2015 video games
Fiction about black holes
GameMaker Studio games
Indie video games
Linux games
MacOS games
Nanotechnology in fiction
Physics in fiction
PlayStation 4 games
PlayStation Network games
Puzzle-platform games
Science fiction comedy
Science fiction video games
Side-scrolling platform games
Single-player video games
Steam Greenlight games
Teleportation in fiction
Video games about artificial intelligence
Video games developed in the Czech Republic
Video games set in the 22nd century
Video games set on fictional planets
Video games with downloadable content
Windows games
Works set in the 2100s
Xbox One games
Xbox Play Anywhere games